Fort Walker may refer to:

Fort Walker (Grant Park), Civil War-era redoubt in Georgia
Fort Walker (Hilton Head), Civil War-era fort in South Carolina